Spyropoulos or Spiropoulos  is a Greek surname. It may refer to:

Andrea Spyropoulos, British nurse
Dimitris Spyropoulos, member of the Greek punk rock band Deus Ex Machina
Farida Mazar Spyropoulos, birth name of Farida or Little Egypt, a Syrian belly dancer
Georgia Spiropoulos (born 1965), Greek composer
Jean Spiropoulos (1896-1972), Greek expert of international law
Kostas Spiropoulos (born 1952), Greek painter and University Professor
Nikos Spyropoulos (born 1983), Greek footballer
Panagiotis Spyropoulos (born 1992), Greek footballer
Theodore Spyropoulos, Greek archeologist
Yiannis Spyropoulos (1912-1990), Greek painter

Greek-language surnames
Surnames